Karl John David Beacom (July 12, 1938 – September 10, 2015) was a Canadian international lawn bowler.

He competed in the first World Bowls Championship in Kyeemagh, New South Wales, Australia in 1966  and won a silver medal in the triples with John Henderson and Sandy Houston at the event.

References

1938 births
2015 deaths
Canadian male bowls players